The Sosva is a river in Sverdlovsk Oblast, Russia, a right tributary of the Tavda in the basin of the Ob.

Course
The Sosva is formed at the confluence of the Big and Small Sosva in the eastern slopes of the Northern Urals. It flows across the West Siberian Lowlands. Finally it meets the right bank of the Tavda River 719 km from its mouth.

The Sosva freezes up in early November and breaks up in April. It is navigable within  of its estuary.

Its main tributaries are the Vagran, the Turya, the Kakva, and the Lyalya.

See also
List of rivers of Russia

References

External links

Rivers of Sverdlovsk Oblast